Thorkell Wallace (Wally) Johannson (born April 10, 1936) is a Canadian former politician. He was a New Democratic member of the Legislative Assembly of Manitoba from 1969 to 1977.

Born in Arborg, Manitoba, the son of Thorkell Johannson and Gudrun Sigvaldason, Johannson was educated at the University of Manitoba, and worked as a high school history teacher before entering political life. He was a member of the Manitoba Historical Society and the Icelandic Canadian Club, among other voluntary organizations. He was the victim of a home invasion in early 1969, and was wounded in a shotgun blast. In 1970, Johannson married Cheryl Taychuk.

He was first elected to the Manitoba legislature in the 1969 provincial election, defeating incumbent Progressive Conservative MLA and future Winnipeg mayor Robert Steen in the riding of St. Matthews. He was re-elected with an increased majority in the election of 1973.

Johannson did not serve in the cabinet of Edward Schreyer. In the 1977 election, he lost his seat to Tory candidate Len Domino by 124 votes. He returned to educational work after his defeat.

Johannson was initially an ally of Schreyer, but became more closely associated with leadership contender Sidney Green as the decade progressed. He attended an early meeting of Green's Progressive Party in 1981, though his loyalty to the NDP ultimately stopped him from joining.

References

Canadian people of Icelandic descent
New Democratic Party of Manitoba MLAs
Living people
1936 births